The Eastside Fire and Rescue is a fire department providing fire protection and  emergency medical services in the eastern portion of King County, Washington. The department is responsible for services in the communities of Carnation, Issaquah, North Bend, Preston, Sammamish, Tiger Mountain and Wilderness Rim.

History
Eastside Fire and Rescue was formed in 1999 as a joint fire department by three cities and two Fire Protection Districts. These municipalities use an Interlocal Agreement to establish how Eastside Fire & Rescue operates. Participating cities are Carnation, Issaquah, North Bend, Preston, Sammamish, Tiger Mountain, Woodinville, and Wilderness Rim.  King County Fire District 10 and King County Fire District 38 are also participating agencies. The consolidation was prompted by the municipalities' desire to provide better fire protection and emergency medical services to the general public in a cost-effective manner.

Stations and apparatus 
, the department has 14 stations spread across 5 battalions.

References

Fire departments in Washington (state)
Government of King County, Washington
Seattle metropolitan area